The 2015 EAFF East Asian Cup was the 6th edition of the EAFF East Asian Cup, the football championship of East Asia. It was held in China in 2015. Two preliminary competitions were held during 2014.

First preliminary round 
All matches were played in Guam.

Awards

Second preliminary round
Venue: TaiwanDate: 13 – 19 November 2014

Awards

Final tournament

Squads

Match officials
Referees

  Alireza Faghani
  Fahad Al-Mirdasi
  Mohd Amirul Izwan
  Muhammad Taqi Aljaafari

Assistant referees

  Nathan MacDonald
  Mohammadreza Mansouri
  Abdullah Al-Shalawi
  Mohd Yusri Bin Muhamad
  Jeffrey Goh
  Hsu Min Yu

Final stage 
The final stage was held in Wuhan, Hubei, China on August 2 to 9, 2015.

Awards

Goalscorers
2 goals

 Yuki Muto

1 goal

 Yu Dabao
 Wang Yongpo
 Wu Lei
 Hotaru Yamaguchi
 Ri Hyok-chol
 Pak Hyon-il
 Jang Hyun-soo
 Kim Seung-dae
 Lee Jong-ho

Final ranking

Per statistical convention in football, matches decided in extra time are counted as wins and losses, while matches decided by penalty shoot-out are counted as draws.

References

External links
 40th EAFF Executive Committee Meeting
 The 7th Ordinary Congress and 41st & 42nd Executive Committee Meeting

2015
East Asian Cup
2015 in Asian football
International association football competitions hosted by China